Wisteria Lane is the name of a fictional street at the center of U.S. television drama series Desperate Housewives. Desperate Housewives storylines primarily center on the residents of the street. The set for Wisteria Lane is located inside Universal Studios Hollywood, and is actually named Colonial Street, an area that has been used for many motion pictures and television shows. Other film and television productions in which Colonial Street has featured include the original Leave It to Beaver series, Gremlins, The 'Burbs, and Buffy the Vampire Slayer.

Production
In 2005, for the second season of Desperate Housewives, the street went through some heavy changes. During the first season only one part of the street had been seen on the show – the cul-de-sac at the end of the street, known as 'Circle Drive' among film crews, had been left out. Now the majority of the buildings and facades in this part of the street were either heavily remodeled or removed. Among the most noticeable changes were the removals of a church facade, seen on Murder, She Wrote, in order to make room for Edie's house, 
and of the so-called Colonial Mansion, which was replaced by a park. In the film Beethoven's 3rd (2000) the street can clearly be seen with the shops and the Church still in place around 'Circle Drive'. The shot begins in circle drive at the shops then Mrs McCluskey's, Lynette's, Katherine's, Bree's, Susan's, Mary Alice's, Betty's and Gaby's are also in shot. The shot then continues into Gaby's driveway and then down the rest of the street.
Colonial Street – including Circle Drive – has sixteen main buildings, with three of them located outside the Desperate Housewives filming area. The house closest to the settings, located next to what's called 4348 Wisteria Lane within the show, is being used by guards to stop any unauthorized access to "Wisteria Lane".

Lots 
The following overview is based upon details and maps given within the show as well as Universal Studios' official website - see below for further details.

No. 4344
‘’’No.4344’’’
This house was used only once on the show, in season 2. Lisa Sidmen and her son live there. 
This house is just an empty shell and is largely uncared for.

No. 4345
‘’’No. 4345’’’

This house has never been used on the show and was seen only once in season 5. It appears to be an old abandoned house.

No. 4346
‘’’No. 4346’’’

This house was owned by Sharon Shesin in season 2.
Mona Clarke was shown living here with her husband and her children in season 5. After her death in season 6 it is assumed that the Clarke family moved out.

No. 4347
No. 4347  is the Greenbergs' house. Ida Greenberg resides here in seasons 1-4. After her death, the house is temporarily occupied by Karen McCluskey. Since season 6 it has been occupied by Mitzi Kinsky. This house is actually a facade and has no interiors.

No. 4348
No. 4348 is Rose Kemper's house from season 1 through season 5. In season 5 she goes to live in a nursing home, and it is unknown who resides there after. 
This house is in truth just an empty shell.

No. 4349
No. 4349 is the home of Carlos and Gabrielle Solis, who have lived there since the summer of 2003. They move out to a mansion in Beverly Hills a year after the series ends. This house has an actual entry and living room. All other interiors shots are filmed on a soundstage in the studio. The backyard of this house (with pool and jacuzzi) was filmed on an actual house in San Fernando Valley.

No. 4350
No. 4350 (commonly known as the Old Huber House) is owned in season 1 by Martha Huber, who had owned the house years earlier as well. After her house burns down, Edie Britt resides with Martha until her new house is re-built. When Paul Young murders her, her sister Felicia Tilman moves in. Felicia stays in the house until the end of season two, where she frames Paul for her "death". This house has an actual first floor (entry, kitchen and living room). The second floor does not exist and was not rebuilt on a soundstage.

Bree Van de Kamp buys the house for her son Andrew Van de Kamp and his partner Alex Cominis in season five. They are still shown living there in season seven. In the middle of the season, Alex moves out because of Andrew's alcoholic problems. By the second half of season eight, Andrew has to move out as well since he lost his job, so he moves back in with Bree.

No. 4351
No. 4351 is the house of Betty Applewhite for the duration of season 2. Beginning in season 4, it is owned by Bob Hunter and Lee McDermott. In season 7 Lee sells his house to Paul Young, and is implied to have gotten it back after Paul returned to prison.

The house for 4351 was strictly avoided by the Desperate Housewives filming crew during season one. This was because it was considered to be too recognizable since being the main setting of The Munsters. Following the decision to introduce the Applewhites, and having them living in the Munster home, the house was completely remodeled.
This house has an actual first floor(entry, living room, kitchen and dining room). Second floor is rebuilt on a soundstage in the studio.

No. 4352
No. 4352 is the home of Mary Alice Young. In season five the house has been painted green and the archway and the beginning of the house has been removed. The Youngs moved in the house in 1990.

In season one, Mary Alice kills herself and leaves the house to be maintained by her husband Paul Young and her son Zachary Young. The two remain in the house until season two, when Paul is arrested for the apparent murder of Felicia Tilman, and Zach inherits his grandfather's fortune. The house is then put on the market by Edie Britt, who sells it to Arthur Shepherd. Art moves out after his sister's death and the Lane finding out he is a pedophile.

In season five, the house is bought by Edie and Dave Williams who rents the house out to Mike Delfino. Mike stays in the house until he moves into Katherine Mayfair's house.

In season six, the Bolen family moves in. The family stay in the house until the end of the season, where Angie Bolen and Nick Bolen move to Atlanta, and their son Danny Bolen goes to New York.

In season seven, the house is reclaimed by Paul Young, who lives across the road in Susan's house. Towards the end of season seven, Paul Young confesses about Martha Huber's murder. In season eight, the resident of 4352 is unknown.

This house has a partial first floor (entry, living room and dining room). All other inside shots(kitchen, family room and second floor) are filmed on a soundstage in the studio. The house is a reproduction of the original Leave it to Beaver house and was constructed for the 1997 Universal film of the same name.

No. 4353
No. 4353 is Susan Mayer's house. Paul Young rented the house throughout the seventh season, with his new wife Beth Young, until Beth kills herself, and Paul soon lets Susan and Mike move back in.

The Mayers moved into the house in 1992. Before season one, Susan lived in the house with her husband Karl Mayer, they divorced and throughout the first four seasons, Susan lived with her daughter Julie Mayer. Her off-and-on relationship meant that Mike Delfino often stayed. At the end of season three, Susan and Mike married, so Mike became a permanent resident.

They remained together in season four. At the end of season four, Julie moved out to go to college, and Susan gave birth to Maynard James Delfino. In season five, Susan and Mike divorced, and Susan started seeing Jackson Braddock. Jackson wanted to move in, but Susan did not allow him to. At the end of season five, Susan and Mike remarried and live in 4353 for season 6.

At the end of season six, Susan and Mike move to an apartment and rent out their house due to financial troubles; unknown to them, Paul Young moves in with his wife Beth. In season seven, Paul finds out the truth about Beth and he throws her out.

In the end of season seven, Mike, Susan and MJ all move back into 4353, when Paul Young is arrested for murder. In season eight, they came back on the lane, but later Mike was murdered by a loan shark. Susan decides to sell her house at the end of the series to a couple named Jennifer and Steve, who are hiding a secret.
This house has an actual entry, a dining room and a kitchen. 
All other interior shots (living room and second floor) are filmed on a soundstage in the studio.

No. 4354
No. 4354 is Bree and Rex Van de Kamp's house. Together in this house, they raised their children, Andrew Van de Kamp and Danielle Van de Kamp. They moved into the house in 1994.

In season three, Bree remarries to Orson Hodge and he becomes a permanent resident in the house. Gloria Hodge, Orson's mother also moves in, a few episodes later and remains until she is kicked out by Bree.

In season four, Danielle gives birth to Benjamin Hodge and he stays in Bree's care until season five. With this, both Andrew and Danielle move out as well. Also at the end of season four, Orson goes to jail for Bree and stays there for three years. When he is released, he returns to the home.

In season five Bree's garage has been reconverted into her and Katherine's test kitchen. The ground floor contains the kitchen and the top floor contains their offices.

At the close of season six, Orson moves out after asking for a divorce. In season seven Bree's contractor boyfriend Keith moves in with her. But when Keith finds out he has a son, the relationship starts to crumble. He tries to get Bree to move to Florida but it ends up in only him leaving. In season eight, Andrew moves back in due to financial reasons.

Three years after the series end, Bree and her former lawyer/new husband, Trip Weston, move off the lane to Kentucky.

This house has no interiors, with it being used as a break room for the cast and crew. Along with Lynette’s house, it is one of only two houses to  have a backyard on the Colonial Street set.

No. 4355
No. 4355 is the Scavos' house. Since the beginning Lynette and Tom Scavo have owned the house. They moved into the house in 1997, living there with their five children, Preston Scavo, Porter Scavo, Parker Scavo, Penny Scavo, Paige Scavo, and Kayla Huttington Scavo. Kayla lives in the house full-time for the middle of season three and all of season four. In season seven, Porter and Preston move out. By the end of season seven, Lynette and Tom decide to separate and divorce after a long fight between the two. In season eight Tom moves out and the twins, Porter and Preston, move back in temporarily. Tom moves back in during the two part finale as they reconcile. They move out four weeks later to New York City where they live in a penthouse overlooking Central Park.
This house is just a shell with no interiors. Interior shots are filmed on a soundstage in the studio.

No. 4356
No. 4356 is commonly known as the Simms House (before season one), The Delfino House (first three seasons), Mayfair House (season four to season six), the Graham House (first half of season seven) and then The Tilman House (middle of season seven to end of season seven). It is assumed that Katherine Mayfair sold the house to Emma Graham (Dana Glover), and then she sold it to Paul in season 7. Felicia Tilman was the owner of the house after inheriting it from her daughter, Beth. Ben Faulkner moved into the house at the start of season eight. It is not known whether Ben still lives in this house or if he moved in with his new wife Renee.

No. 4358
No. 4358 is the home of Karen McCluskey.  She is one of the oldest residents on the lane and has lived there for 35 years. After the tornado in "Something's Coming", Karen's home was completely destroyed. A replacement blue house has been constructed in time for the fifth season. This house has a working second floor.

In season six, Karen starts a relationship with Roy Bender and he moves in. They marry in between the end of season six and beginning of season seven. Not wanting to return to Bree, Orson Hodge had arranged to stay with them, but Bree took him back.

Karen dies in the series finale so the house is only occupied by Roy.

No. 4362
No. 4362 is the home of Edie Britt until her death in season five. She moved onto the Lane sometime in early 2003. The original house was burned down by Susan Mayer in the pilot episode. The house was rebuilt for season two in 2005.

At the beginning of season seven, the house was rented by Renee Perry, a college friend of Lynette's. It is not known whether Renee still lives in this house or if she moved in with her new husband Ben. For unknown reasons, in episodes "Sorry Grateful" and "Finishing the Hat" the numbers on the door of Renee's house were changed to 4359.

Residents
These are the known residents of Wisteria Lane, covering episodes (1.01—5.24). Note that no residents 4348 (Drew House) and 4360 Wisteria Lane have been mentioned, although an unnamed woman, played by an uncredited actress, is seen living in no. 4360 in episode 4.02. Also in Season 2, there is a black haired woman living here. In Season 3, there is a blonde haired cheating housewife here. Also, in Season 3, Mrs McCluskey is seen reporting a man washing his pet Pig on the lawn of 4360. Most likely neighborhood big mouth Mona Clark lives here, although in Season 5 she is shown living at the Corner House.

Changes
Before the large changes to the set after Season One, 4360 and 4362 Wisteria Lane, as well as the park, situated around the cul-de-sac, were not shown.

Where 4360 Wisteria Lane was built, was formerly store façades and a school façade.  At 4362, Edie Britt's home, was originally a church façade that was removed. That church was seen in Murder, She Wrote (1984) as "Cabot Cove's community church".  Where the park is now (see map), was previously a relatively larger home, "Colonial Mansion." In season 1 Susan Mayer burns down Edie Britt's house and there are changes to the kitchen and exterior.

Before the start of Season 4, Mike's old house is completely remodeled. The walls around the staircase have been torn down to open up the ground floor completely. Both the upstairs and downstairs are re-wallpapered with bright reds and pastel colors. Gabrielle Giaquinta resided in the Delfino house for awhile, before Mike moved back in with Susan and M.J.

After the tornado in "Something's Coming", Karen McCluskey's home was completely destroyed. A replacement blue house has been constructed in time for the fifth season. This house has a working 2nd floor. In addition to this, the former residence of Mary Alice Young has been painted green and the archway and the beginning of the house has been removed. Bree's garage has been reconverted into her and Katherine's test kitchen. The ground floor contains the kitchen and the top floor contains their offices. Also in season five 4350, the former home of Martha Huber and Felicia Tilman has been painted a pale yellow - green color however by the time of season six it has been restored to its original color, green.

It is revealed during "Color and Light" (Season 2) that Mona Clark lived at number 4360. But in season 5 and 6 we can see that she lived in 4348. She was, however, strictly a background character and was even credited at Mother #2, until her death in the Season 6 episode "If...".

Official maps

1989-1996 Colonial Street map
The official website of Universal Studios Hollywood presents a map of Colonial Street, as it looked between 1989 and 1996. Besides the changes made during the first year of Desperate Housewives, the main difference between this map and the current look of the street is that the houses known in Desperate Housewives as 4352 Wisteria Lane and 4354 Wisteria Lane (Mary Alice's and Bree's houses) replaced two older buildings in 1996.

Mike's map
In episode two of Desperate Housewives, "Ah, But Underneath", a map of the street and details about its residents is seen in one of Mike's lockers. This map confirms the location of Susan's, Lynette's, Gabrielle's, Bree's, Mary Alice's, Mike's and Martha Huber's houses, as well as the existence of one house between Susan's and Gabrielle's, one house beyond Gabrielle's and one house beyond Mike's. However, it does not cover the part of the street that include the house on the far side of Martha Huber's house, nor the buildings around the cul-de-sac, which wasn't included in the show's setting at the time. With two exceptions, all ten houses have the same number as otherwise stated in the series.

There are some differences between Mike's map and the established version:
Although most house numbers are the same as otherwise stated, there are two exceptions: The house between Susan's and Gabrielle's houses (later known as the Applewhite house) is noted as 4354, and Bree's house is said to be 4359. Generally these houses are shown to be 4351 and 4354 Wisteria Lane, respectively, with Mike's map being the only exception.
The residents of the house between the houses of Gabrielle and of Susan are said to be Trent and Debra Nelson, although the Mullins is mentioned in the dialogue earlier in the same episode. This is the only time the Nelson's names has occurred in the series.
The resident of 4347 Wisteria Lane is not said to be Ida Greenberg - this character is not introduced until episode five, "Come In, Stranger". Instead there are two other names noted, but too blurry to be read properly. However, Morris, their last name, is readable. Also, one of them seems to be named Gary, and they're 42 and 38 years old respectively.
Also to be noted is that Lynette's daughter Penny is called Daisy on the map.

In addition, although the camera briefly passes by 4358 Wisteria Lane - the house that (starting with episode 14, "Love Is in the Air") would be known as Karen McCluskey's home - it turns away before any names are shown.

"Behind Closed Doors" map
A map of Wisteria Lane is also included in the official season one companion book, Desperate Housewives: Behind Closed Doors, published in 2005. This map does not show the house numbers but confirms the existence and location of most Wisteria Lane houses to appear on the show. The exceptions are the three buildings beyond Karen McCluskey's house, which were not added to the shows filming location until season two. Also - while most of the houses on the map are labeled "The Scavo House", "The Young House" etc., the houses now known as the McCluskey house, the Greenberg house and 4348 Wisteria Lane, are left without any description.

See also
 Colonial Street
 Courthouse Square
 RKO Forty Acres

Notes

References

External links

 1988 map of Colonial Street during the filming of the 'Burbs)
 1989-1996 map of Colonial Street (hi-res version but church façade cut off)
 Overview photo of Colonial Street in 2004, before Colonial Mansion, the Church façade, and School and Stores façades were removed for Season Two of Desperate Housewives

Homes
 Building #1 - Delta House
 Building #2 - Allison Home
 Building #3 - Munsters House (originally known as the Maxim house)
 Building #4 - Johnson Home
 Building #5 - Dana Home
 Colonial Mansion
 Church (Façade was removed in 2005 to build  Desperate Housewives character Edie Britt's house)
 Building #11 - Drew House
 Building #12 - Corner House
 Building #13 - Seven Gables
 Building #14 - Chicken Ranch Building

Backlot sets
Fictional streets and roads
Desperate Housewives
Universal Parks & Resorts attractions by name

es:Wisteria Lane